The Eyalet of Herzegovina was an administrative division (eyalet) of the Ottoman Empire from 1833 to 1851. Its last capital was Mostar.

History

In 1831, Bosnian kapudan Husein Gradaščević occupied Travnik, demanding autonomy and the end of military reforms in Bosnia. Ultimately, exploiting the rivalries between beys and kapudans, the grand vizier succeeded in detaching the Herzegovinian forces, led by Ali-paša Rizvanbegović, from Gradaščević’s. The revolt was crushed, and in 1833, a new eyalet of Herzegovina was created from the southern part of the eyalet of Bosnia and given to Ali Agha Rizvanbegović as a reward for his contribution in crushing the uprising. This new entity lasted only for 18 years, that is, for the rest of Rizvanbegović's life: he was executed when the Porte discovered he was secretly building an independent power base. After Rizvanbegović's death, it was reintegrated into the Bosnia eyalet.

Administrative divisions
The Pashaluk of Herzegovina was formed from following kazas: Prijepolje, Pljevlja with Kolašin and Šaranci with Drobnjak, Čajniče, Nevesinje, Nikšić, Ljubinje-Trebinje, Stolac, Počitelj, Blagaj, Mostar, Duvno and half of the county of Konjic which is on southern side of Neretva.

References

 Dr. Lazar Tomanović, Petar Drugi Petrović, Njegoš kao vladalac, Državna Stamparija (1896).

External links
Administrative divisions of Herzegovina

Eyalets of the Ottoman Empire in Europe
Ottoman period in the history of Bosnia and Herzegovina
History of Herzegovina
Historical regions of Bosnia and Herzegovina
Ottoman period in the history of Montenegro
States and territories established in 1833
States and territories disestablished in 1851
1833 establishments in the Ottoman Empire
1851 disestablishments in the Ottoman Empire
1833 establishments in Europe
1851 disestablishments in Europe
19th century in Bosnia and Herzegovina
Former subdivisions of Bosnia and Herzegovina during Ottoman period